Durio oxleyanus is a perennial plant species of tree in the family Malvaceae. It was once placed in the family Bombacaceae. 

The IUCN list the species as near threatened.

It is a popular plant for food among humans and orangutans.

Names 

In English it goes by common names like isu, durian lai, oxyleyanus durian, Durian Hutan, Durian, and Durian meragang.

The native names include: durian beludu in Malaysia; durian daun in Sumatra; durian sukang or simply sukang in Brunei and Sabah; and kerantongan or kerantungan in Kalimantan.

Description 
Trees in species can grow up to 45 meters or up to 50 meters tall and have dark brown bark. It has a self-supporting growth form too.

Fruits 
The fruit the tree produces fruits that are edible. With a smooth creamy texture with a sweet flavor similar to banana or grape. The fruits are gray and are 15 to 20 centimeters in diameter.

Distribution 
It is native to Borneo, Malaysia, and Sumatera.

It can be found in more moist parts of lowland rainforests.

Uses 
It is rarely cultivated for food in its native area. The timber from this plant is used for building houses. 

The species is also used for medicine to treat Malaria. In Indonesia, it is also used for ulcers and wounds. However, the plant has not been studied in pharmacology.

Threats 
They are classified as near threatened by the IUCN due to large deforestation of lowland forests.  Development of urban areas, extension of agricultural land, industrial plantation, and mining are the influence for deforestation.

References

External links 
 

oxleyanus
Flora of Borneo
Flora of Sumatra